Zangi Kuh (also Romanized as Zangī Kūh; also known as Dāgh Zangī and Dag-Zangi) is a village in Qareh Poshtelu-e Bala Rural District, Qareh Poshtelu District, Zanjan County, Zanjan Province, Iran. At the 2006 census, its population was 160, in 40 families.

References 

Populated places in Zanjan County